Walter Kluge was a German luger who competed during the 1930s. He was an active fighter against German fascism and was killed on April, 22nd 1944 in prison in Brandenburg-Görden. He lived in Schmölln (near Altenburg). He won six medals at the European luge championships with four golds (Men's doubles: 1934, 1935, 1938, 1939) and two silvers (Men's singles: 1938, Men's doubles: 1937).

References

German male lugers
Year of birth missing
Year of death missing